The Nikon 1 J5 is a digital mirrorless camera announced by Nikon on April 2, 2015.

See also
 Nikon 1 series
 Nikon 1-mount

References

Nikon MILC cameras
J5
Cameras introduced in 2015